"Are You Ready for Love" is a song recorded by English musician Elton John in 1977 and first released in the UK in 1979 as the first single from the EP The Thom Bell Sessions.  It was written by Leroy Bell, Thom Bell and Casey James, and was originally produced in Philadelphia by Thom Bell (who had already produced a series of hits for the Spinners, the Delfonics and the Stylistics).  While the song "Mama Can't Buy You Love" from the EP charted in 1979, this song and the other track on the three-track 12-inch vinyl disc, "Three Way Love Affair", were only minor footnotes at the time.

In 1989, MCA released a 6-track CD, The Complete Thom Bell Sessions, which contained a different mix of "Are You Ready for Love" in place of the one that appeared on the original 1979 EP. (The original Thom Bell Sessions EP mix did, however, surface – along with the EP's other two original tracks – as a B-side to a UK CD-single of "The Last Song" in 1992, issued as Rocket/Phonogram EJSCB-30).

2003 version

In 2003, "Are You Ready for Love" was remixed by Ashley Beedle and released as a 12-inch vinyl single on 25 August 2003. It gave John the sixth No. 1 hit of his career when it topped the UK Singles Chart in the first week of its 2003 re-release, following his performance of the song in a television advertisement promoting the new 2003–04 football season for Sky Sports. The 2003 single's B-side is "Three Way Love Affair" (from the original EP) and also the full-length 1979 version of "Are You Ready for Love". On some CD versions, the CD also contains a QuickTime version of a video for the song, with recording studio footage from 1977 with John recording his vocals.

Various hit R&B vocalists of the late 1970s, including Bell and James, MFSB and the Spinners with lead singer John Edwards, contributed backing and accompanying lead vocals, most prominent on the Thom Bell Sessions mixes of the song. In 1979, the Spinners also recorded a version of the song which charted at number 25 on the US Billboard R&B chart.

The music video, produced in a 1970s retro style, was directed by Kate Dawkins.

Track listings
UK, US, and Australian CD single
 "Are You Ready for Love" ('79 radio edit)
 "Are You Ready for Love" (full length 1979 version)
 "Three Way Love Affair"
 "Are You Ready for Love" (CD-ROM video)

UK 12-inch single 1
A. "Are You Ready for Love" (full length '79 version)
B. "Are You Ready for Love" (Freeform Reform remix)

UK 12-inch single 2
A. "Are You Ready for Love" ('79 original)
B. "Are You Ready for Love" (Ashley Beedle Love and Protection mono edit)

UK cassette single
 "Are You Ready for Love" ('79 radio edit)
 "Are You Ready for Love" (full length 1979 version)
 "Three Way Love Affair"

European CD single
 "Are You Ready for Love" ('79 radio edit)
 "Are You Ready for Love" (full length 1979 version)

US 12-inch single
A1. "Are You Ready for Love" (Linus Loves Strobelight mix)
A2. "Are You Ready for Love" (79 full length)
B1. "Are You Ready for Love" (Mylo's Road Map to Peace remix)
B2. "Are You Ready for Love" (Ashley Beedle Love and Protection mono re-edit)

Charts and certifications

Weekly charts

Year-end charts

Certifications

Cover versions
In 2003, the Spinners reissued "Are You Ready for Love", featuring them on backing vocals. In 1977, the Spinners had recorded two versions of the track. One had all of the Spinners, the other with only lead singer John Edwards on vocals. Finally in 1979, the John Edwards version was released making it to number 42 on the UK Singles Chart.

In popular culture
"Are You Ready for Love" was featured on the European version of Donkey Konga 2.

See also
 List of number-one dance singles of 2004 (U.S.)

References

1977 songs
1979 singles
2003 singles
Elton John songs
The Spinners (American group) songs
Number-one singles in Scotland
UK Singles Chart number-one singles
UK Independent Singles Chart number-one singles
Songs written by Thom Bell
Songs written by LeRoy Bell
The Rocket Record Company singles
Mercury Records singles
Ultra Records singles